Jeffrey Kenneth Moss (born 29 June 1947) is a former Australian cricketer who played in one Test matches and one One Day International (ODI) in 1979.

An opening batsman, Moss made his first-class cricket debut for Victoria in 1976/77 and was a steady contributor for Victoria without attracting the interest of national selectors until Australia lost many of its leading players to World Series Cricket (WSC). Moss was picked for the last Test of the 1978–79 series against Pakistan. However he was not selected for the subsequent 1979 tour of India, and dropped out of contention altogether when the WSC players returned to test cricket for the summer of 1979–80.

Moss along with Julien Wiener had a partnership of 390 at the Junction Oval against Western Australia in 1981–82. This still stands as a record for the third wicket for Australians in first-class cricket.

He is married to Victorian Member of Parliament Cindy McLeish.

See also
One Test Wonder

References

External links
Victorian Premier Cricket Profile

1947 births
Living people
Australia Test cricketers
Australia One Day International cricketers
Victoria cricketers
Melbourne Cricket Club cricketers
Australian cricketers
Cricketers from Melbourne
Cricketers at the 1979 Cricket World Cup